Jaden Brown (born 24 January 1999) is an English professional footballer who plays as a defender for Sheffield Wednesday.

Career

Early career
Brown signed to the Tottenham Hotspur youth academy in July 2015. At the beginning of the 2019 transfer window Brown was sold on a free transfer to Huddersfield Town. He went immediately out on loan to Exeter City for the rest of the season. On 24 August 2019 Brown made his home debut for Huddersfield against Reading, he received a yellow card in the match in the 2–0 loss. He would leave Huddersfield Town at the end of the 2021-21 season, when his contract was not renewed.

Sheffield Wednesday
On 14 July 2021, he joined recently relegated League One side Sheffield Wednesday. He would make his competitive debut on 1 August 2021, at home to Huddersfield Town, coming off the bench in the first half replacing Olamide Shodipo.

International career

Youth
Born in England, Brown is of Jamaican descent. He was part of the England under-16 team that won the Montaigu Tournament in 2015. He has gone on to represent England at U17, U18 and U19 levels.

Career statistics

References

External links

1999 births
Living people
Footballers from Lewisham
English footballers
England youth international footballers
English sportspeople of Jamaican descent
Tottenham Hotspur F.C. players
Huddersfield Town A.F.C. players
Exeter City F.C. players
Sheffield Wednesday F.C. players
English Football League players
Association football fullbacks
Black British sportspeople